"Spoon" is a Dave Matthews Band song from the album Before These Crowded Streets.  Dave Matthews used Peter Gabriel's song "Passion" as an inspiration for this song.

The song features Alanis Morissette on background vocals and one verse, and Béla Fleck on banjo.

References

External links
DMBAlmanac.com lyrics
DMBAlmanac.com listing

Dave Matthews Band songs
1998 songs
Songs written by Dave Matthews
Song recordings produced by Steve Lillywhite